Kenneth Francis Landreaux  (born December 22, 1954) is an American former professional baseball center fielder. He played in Major League Baseball for the California Angels, Minnesota Twins, and Los Angeles Dodgers from 1977 through 1987.

Playing career
After graduating from Dominguez High School in Compton, California, Landreaux was drafted by the Houston Astros in the eighth round of the 1973 Major League Baseball draft, but chose to attend Arizona State University. While at Arizona State, he played in the 1975 and 1976 College World Series on teams that included future major leaguers Floyd Bannister, Chris Bando, and Bob Horner.

Landreaux was selected by the California Angels in the first round of the 1976 Major League Baseball draft. In his major league debut with the Angels, on September 11, 1977, against the Chicago White Sox, Landreaux threw out three base runners from the outfield.

In , the Angels traded Landreaux, Dave Engle, Paul Hartzell, and Brad Havens to the Minnesota Twins for Rod Carew. In 1980, Landreaux set a Minnesota record with a 31-game hitting streak, tied for the longest in the AL since Dom DiMaggio's 34 in 1949. He still holds the record for most consecutive games with a hit in Minnesota Twins history.

Landreaux was a member of the 1981 World Series champion Los Angeles Dodgers, and caught the final out of the 1981 World Series, a fly ball to center field off the bat of Bob Watson. Landreaux's best seasons were 1982 and 1983. Usually batting 2nd in the order, he combined with leadoff man Steve Sax to give the Dodgers two formidable "table setters." Landreaux hit over .280 and had at least 30 stolen bases in each of those seasons. He also hit a career high 17 home runs for the 1983 National League Western Division champion Dodgers.

Career statistics
In 1264 games over 11 seasons, Landreaux compiled a .268 batting average (1099-for-4101) with 522 runs, 180 doubles, 45 triples, 91 home runs, 479 RBI, 145 stolen bases, 299 base on balls, 421 strikeouts, .317 on-base percentage and .400 slugging percentage. Defensively, he recorded a .981 fielding percentage at all three outfield positions. In postseason play covering 24 games, he batted .221 (15-for-68) with 6 runs and 4 RBI.

Post-playing career
After retiring, Landreaux abused substances. After achieving sobriety, he worked as a counselor at Bellwood Health Center in Bellflower, California. He and Darrell Jackson, a former baseball teammate, founded the Athletic Connection Team to aid athletes with substance use problems. Landreaux spends his time teaching young baseball players at the Urban Youth Academy in Compton. Ken Landreaux returned to Arizona State University in 2012 and earned a Bachelor of Liberal Studies Degree in 2014.

Personal life
Landreaux is a cousin of former major league third baseman Enos Cabell.

References

External links

1954 births
Living people
Major League Baseball center fielders
California Angels players
Minnesota Twins players
Los Angeles Dodgers players
American League All-Stars
Baseball players from Los Angeles
African-American baseball players
Arizona State Sun Devils baseball players
Los Angeles Dodgers Legend Bureau
Águilas Cibaeñas players
American expatriate baseball players in the Dominican Republic
El Paso Diablos players
Salt Lake City Gulls players
Albuquerque Dukes players
Rochester Red Wings players
St. Petersburg Pelicans players
Orlando Juice players
All-American college baseball players
21st-century African-American people
20th-century African-American sportspeople